"Antidote" is a song by American rapper and singer Travis Scott. It was released on July 28, 2015, as the second single from his debut studio album, Rodeo (2015). The song was produced by WondaGurl and Eestbound. The song peaked at number 16 on the US Billboard Hot 100 chart. Since then it has been certified quadruple platinum by the Recording Industry Association of America (RIAA).

Background
The song was first heard when Travis Scott performed it live at JMBLYA. It was later released on June 21, 2015. "Antidote" was not initially intended to appear on Rodeo, as confirmed on Scott's SoundCloud on June 23, 2015: "This is for the real fans; the real ragers! This is some vibes for the summer. This isn’t on Rodeo… it’s coming soon." However, due to the song's popularity, Scott included the track on his debut album. On July 29, 2015, "Antidote" was released via digital distribution as the album's second single. The song samples "All I Need" by Lee Fields and The Expressions.

Music video
On September 3, 2015, a teaser for the "Antidote" music video was uploaded on Scott's Vevo channel. The video premiered on September 18, 2015. The music video features Dominican models Yaris Sanchez and Ayisha Diaz and rapper Rich Hil (with green hair).

Live performances
On September 23, 2015, Travis Scott performed "Antidote", live on national television, on Jimmy Kimmel Live. On November 17, 2015, in between dates on The Weeknd's "Madness Fall Tour," Travis Scott appeared on Late Night with Seth Meyers, where he performed a medley of "Antidote" and "Pray 4 Love".

Charts

Weekly charts

Year-end charts

Certifications

Radio and release history

References

External links
 
 

2015 songs
2015 singles
Grand Hustle Records singles
Epic Records singles
Songs written by Travis Scott
Travis Scott songs
Songs about drugs
Songs about cannabis
Songs written by WondaGurl